Cannabis Corner is the first city-owned cannabis shop with its first location at 420 Evergreen Drive, North Bonneville, Washington, USA.  the main storefront is located in Stevenson, Washington.

History

The store opened on March 7, 2015, and held its grand opening ceremony the weekend of April 20, 2015. Activities included vendor demonstrations and an open house hosted by the city of North Bonneville with staff from Cannabis Corner and Skamania County's chamber of commerce.

Despite receiving national attention during its opening, the shop was reportedly struggling financially by May 2015. By September 2016, Cannabis Corner had generated $2.2 million in revenue.

 Cannabis Corner is located in Stevenson, Washington

References

External links
 
 

2015 establishments in Washington (state)
2015 in cannabis
Cannabis in Washington (state)
American companies established in 2015
Government-owned companies of the United States
Skamania County, Washington
Cannabis dispensaries in the United States